Helichrysum sphaeroideum is a species of plant from South Africa.

Description 
Slender branches grow from the base and often tangle together. They are covered with thin, white felt-like hairs. The leaves are oval or elongated ovals. They are white felted beneath and hairless above. 

Flowers are most common in December and January, but may be present between September and February. The flower heads are disc shaped with few to many growing in dense terminal clusters. The inner bracts spread above the white flowers. The tips of the petals way be tinged reddish or pink.  Each flower has eight to thirty florets. The ovaries are hairy.

Distribution and habitat 
This species grows on the Cape mountains of South Africa. It ranges from Tulbagh and Paarl to Groot Swartberg, north of Calitzdorp. It prefers damp sandstone slopes, usually growing in more sheltered areas such as gullies and ravines.

Conservation 
This species is considered to be of least concern by the South African National Biodiversity Institute.

References 

Flora of South Africa
Plants described in 1910
sphaeroideum